Drumlough may refer to:
Drumlough, Hillsborough
Drumlough, Rathfriland